Amarashilpi Jakanachari is a 1964 Indian Kannada-language film, directed and produced by B. S. Ranga. It stars Kalyan Kumar in the eponymous role of Amarashilpi Jakanachari, a sculptor who lived in the 12th-century Hoysala Empire. It also features B. Saroja Devi, Udaykumar and V. Nagayya. The film score and soundtrack were composed by S. Rajeswara Rao. The film was the first Kannada feature film fully shot in color. The director remade the movie in Telugu in the same year as Amara Shilpi Jakkanna.

Cast

 Kalyan Kumar as Amarashilpi Jakanachari
 B. Saroja Devi as Manjari
 Udaykumar
 V. Nagayya
 Dhoolipala
 Narasimharaju
 D. Raghavendra Rao
 H. R. Shastry
 Balaraju
 Shyam
 Srinivas
 Ramadevi
 Girija
 Pushpavalli
 Shakunthala
 H. B. Soraja
 Chiranjeevi Kaleshwari
 Jayalalitha in a dance sequence
 Ratan Kumar in a dance sequence

References

External links
 

1964 films
1960s Kannada-language films
Kannada films remade in other languages
Films set in the Hoysala Empire
Films directed by B. S. Ranga